Lovro Marinov Dobričević or Lorenzo Bon, Lorenzo di Marino da Cattaro (c. 1420 – 1478) was a painter from Venetian Dalmatia.

Born in Kotor, Republic of Venice (now Montenegro), he studied art in Venice before returning to Ragusa (modern-day Dubrovnik) to work. He first started to paint in the Serbian Orthodox Savina Monastery in Zeta and Serbian Despotate (now Montenegro) in the mid-15th century.
Also, his paintings may still be seen in both the Dominican and Franciscan monasteries in the city of Dubrovnik; one of his altarpieces may still be seen in a church in Slano.

He was part of a group called the Ragusan School of Painting which included Blaž Jurjev Trogiranin, Jovan Ugrinović, Mihajlo Hamzić (Michael Joannis Theutonici) and Nikola Božidarević (Nicolò Raguseo). They specialized in painting icons and iconostasis for both churches and monasteries of the Serbian Orthodox Church in Montenegro and Bosnia-Herzegovina, and Polyptych of the Roman Church tradition in Dubrovnik. He died in Dubrovnik.

See also
 Giorgio Schiavone
 Giorgio da Sebenico
 Vitus of Kotor, the architect of Visoki Dečani

References

 Robin Harris: Povijest Dubrovnika, Golden marketing-Tehnička knjiga, Zagreb 2006.
 Monasteries: Realm of the Black Mountain - Picture stories - ESI

1420s births
1478 deaths
15th-century painters
Ragusan painters
Painters from Venice
Montenegrin painters
People from Kotor
Italian painters
Catholic painters
Republic of Venice people